Munokoa Poto Williams  (born 7 January 1962) is a New Zealand Labour Party politician and a member of Parliament. She was elected in a 2013 by-election and served as Minister of Conservation and Minister for Disability Issues in the Sixth Labour Government.

Early life and education
Williams is of Cook Island descent. Her parents, Nahora and Marion Williams, migrated to New Zealand in the 1950s. She was born in Wellington and grew up in Auckland, where she attended Beresford Street School and Auckland Girls' Grammar. Williams graduated from Southern Cross University in Australia with an MBA.

Professional career
Williams has a background working on family and sexual violence issues. She has worked for the Ministry of Education, BirthRight, Healthcare NZ and disability agencies. She has served as a member of the Community Child Protection Review Panel, was involved in the Waitakere Community Law Service and Community Waitakere, and was part of the Living Wage Campaign and the LIFEWISE Big Sleepout.

She moved from Auckland to Christchurch's suburb of New Brighton in January 2013 to take up a position as regional manager of the St John of God Hauora Trust but resigned from that role to run for Parliament later that year.

Political career 

Christchurch East MP Lianne Dalziel resigned in October 2013 to contest the Christchurch mayoralty, triggering a by-election. Williams won selection as Labour's candidate over five other candidates including future Christchurch city councillor Deon Swiggs and James Caygill (son of former Labour Finance Minister David Caygill). She convincingly defeated National's candidate Matt Doocey, securing 61 per cent of the vote. On 28 January 2014, Williams was sworn in as a member of the House of Representatives for the first time. After Alfred Ngaro, she is the second Cook Islander to be a New Zealand MP.

Williams held her electorate over National candidate Jo Hayes by 4,073 votes in the 2014 general election. She defeated Hayes again in 2017, by 7,480 votes, and new National candidate Lincoln Platt in 2020 by 17,336 votes.

Opposition, 2013–2017 
In her first year as an MP, Williams was appointed to the Health Committee and was Labour's associate spokesperson for social development, the community and voluntary sector, and housing (Christchurch).

After the election she nominated Andrew Little to succeed David Cunliffe as Labour leader. In the 2014–2017 term, Williams served on the Health and Social Services committees and was Labour's spokesperson on disability issues and the community and voluntary sector. She became Labour's junior whip when Jacinda Ardern became leader in September 2017.

Sixth Labour Government, 2017–present 
On 19 October 2017, a Labour-led coalition government was formed with support from New Zealand First and the Green parties. Williams was nominated and elected an Assistant Speaker of the New Zealand House of Representatives. The National Party challenged her nomination for the office because Williams had not been sworn in as a member of Parliament for that term yet. Speaker Trevor Mallard dismissed the challenges because it is not a requirement for members of Parliament to be sworn in to be nominated as a presiding officer.

Following a cabinet reshuffle in late June 2019, Williams was appointed as a minister outside Cabinet, becoming Minister for the Community and Voluntary Sector as well as an Associate Minister for Greater Christchurch Regeneration, Social Development and Immigration. When Labour was returned to government in the 2020 general election, she was transferred into the roles of Minister of Police and Minister for Building and Construction and also became an associate minister in the children and public housing portfolios.

Williams' appointment as police minister came as a surprise to some commentators as she was seen to be a contrast with her predecessor, Stuart Nash. Through 2022, Williams was under pressure in the role as a surge of gang activity caused conflict between the Tribesmen and Killer Beez gangs in Auckland. Prime Minister Jacinda Ardern acknowledged that "focus" in the police portfolio had been lost and, in a reshuffle on 13 June 2022, reassigned Willilams to be  Minister of Conservation and Minister for Disability Issues.

On 13 December 2022, Williams announced that she would not be contesting the 2023 New Zealand general election and would step down at the end of the 2020–2023 term. While describing her job as an MP and Cabinet as an "extraordinary and amazing privilege," Williams stated that the Christchurch East electorate needed "someone with fresh eyes and fresh energy." On 10 February 2023, Williams was granted retention of the title "The Honourable" for life, in recognition of her term as a member of the Executive Council.

Political positions
In May 2017, Williams suggested removing the presumption of innocence afforded to alleged perpetrators of sexual assault. She voted in favour of the Abortion Legislation Bill in March 2020 and against the End of Life Choice Bill in December 2019.

References

External links
 

|-

1962 births
New Zealand people of Cook Island descent
New Zealand Labour Party MPs
Women members of the New Zealand House of Representatives
Members of the New Zealand House of Representatives
New Zealand MPs for Christchurch electorates
People educated at Auckland Girls' Grammar School
Southern Cross University alumni
People from Wellington City
Living people
21st-century New Zealand politicians
21st-century New Zealand women politicians
Candidates in the 2020 New Zealand general election